Dimethyldichlorosilane is a tetrahedral, organosilicon compound with the formula Si(CH3)2Cl2.  At room temperature it is a colorless liquid that readily reacts with water to form both linear and cyclic Si-O chains.  Dimethyldichlorosilane is made on an industrial scale as the principal precursor to dimethylsilicone and polysilane compounds.

History
The first organosilicon compounds were reported in 1863 by Charles Friedel and James Crafts who synthesized tetraethylsilane from diethylzinc and silicon tetrachloride. However, major progress in organosilicon chemistry did not occur until Frederick Kipping and his students began experimenting with diorganodichlorosilanes (R2SiCl2) that were prepared by reacting silicon tetrachloride with Grignard reagents. Unfortunately, this method suffered from many experimental problems.

In the 1930s, the demand for silicones increased due to the need for better insulators for electric motors and sealing materials for aircraft engines, and with it the need for a more efficient synthesis of dimethyldichlorosilane. To solve the problem, General Electric, Corning Glass Works, and Dow Chemical Company began a partnership that ultimately became the Dow Corning Company.  During 1941–1942, Eugene G. Rochow, a chemist from General Electric, and Richard Müller, working independently in Germany, found an alternate synthesis of dimethyldichlorosilane that allowed it to be produced on an industrial scale.  This Direct Synthesis, or Direct process, which is used in today’s industry, involves the reaction of elemental silicon with methyl chloride in the presence of a copper catalyst.

Preparation

Rochow's synthesis involved passing methyl chloride through a heated tube packed with ground silicon and copper(I) chloride. The current industrial method places finely ground silicon in a fluidized bed reactor at about 300 °C. The catalyst is applied as Cu2O. Methyl chloride is then passed through the reactor to produce mainly dimethyldichlorosilane.

2 CH3Cl + Si → (CH3)2SiCl2

The mechanism of the direct synthesis is not known. However, the copper catalyst is essential for the reaction to proceed.

In addition to dimethyldichlorosilane, products of this reaction include CH3SiCl3, CH3SiHCl2, and (CH3)3SiCl, which are separated from each other by fractional distillation.  The yields and boiling points of these products are shown in the following chart.

Main reactions
Dimethyldichlorosilane hydrolyzes to form linear and cyclic silicones, compounds containing Si-O backbones. The length of the resulting polymer is dependent on the concentration of chain ending groups that are added to the reaction mixture. The rate of the reaction is determined by the transfer of reagents across the aqueous-organic phase boundary; therefore, the reaction is most efficient under turbulent conditions. The reaction medium can be varied further to maximize the yield of a specific product.

n(CH3)2SiCl2 + nH2O → [(CH3)2SiO]n + 2nHCl
m(CH3)2SiCl2 + (m+1)H2O → HO[Si(CH3)2O]mH + 2mHCl

Dimethyldichlorosilane reacts with methanol to produce dimethoxydimethylsilanes.

(CH3)2SiCl2 + 2CH3OH → (CH3)2Si(OCH3)2 + 2HCl

Although the hydrolysis of dimethoxydimethylsilanes is slower, it is advantageous when the hydrochloric acid byproduct is unwanted:

n(CH3)2Si(OCH3)2 + nH2O → [(CH3)2SiO]n + 2nCH3OH

Because dimethyldichlorosilane is easily hydrolyzed, it cannot be handled in air.  One method used to overcome this problem is to convert it to a less reactive bis(dimethylamino)silane.

(CH3)2SiCl2 + 4HN(CH3)2 → (CH3)2Si[N(CH3)2]2 + 2H2N(CH3)2Cl

Another benefit to changing dimethyldichlorosilane to its bis(dimethylamino)silane counterpart is that it forms an exactly alternating polymer when combined with a disilanol comonomer.

n(CH3)2Si[N(CH3)2]2 + nHO(CH2)2SiRSi(CH2)2OH → [(CH3)2SiO(CH2)2SiRSi(CH2)2O]n + 2nHN(CH3)2

Sodium metal can be used to polymerize dimethyldichlorosilane, producing polysilane chains with a Si-Si backbone. For example, dodecamethylcyclohexasilane can be prepared in this way:
6(CH3)2SiCl2 + 12M → ((CH3)2Si)6 + 12MCl
The reaction also produces polydimethylsilane and decamethylpentasilane. Diverse types of dichlorosilane precursors, such as Ph2SiCl2, can be added to adjust the properties of the polymer.

In organic synthesis it (together with its close relative diphenyldichlorosilane) is used as a protecting group for gem-diols.

Applications

The main purpose of dimethyldichlorosilane is for use in the synthesis of silicones, an industry that was valued at more than $10 billion per year in 2005.  It is also employed in the production of polysilanes, which in turn are precursors to silicon carbide.  In practical uses, dichlorodimethylsilane can be used as a coating on glass to avoid the adsorption of micro-particles.

References

Chlorosilanes